The Santa Cruz Symphony is a symphonic orchestra in Santa Cruz, California. The symphony is led by Daniel Stewart, Music Director since 2013. The symphony performs at the Santa Cruz Civic Auditorium and the Mello Center for the Performing Arts in Watsonville, California. Each year the Symphony performs five classical music concerts in Santa Cruz and Watsonville, a pops concert, and a family concert. The Symphony has a free youth concert program for 4th and 5th graders.

History
In 1958, the Santa Cruz Sentinel put out a call for musicians for a new orchestra. Thirty-eight musicians attended the organizational meeting on March 10, 1958 and a total of 70 ultimately expressed interest in playing in the new Symphony.

After ten rehearsal dates, with Detlev Anders of the San Francisco Symphony leading, the Symphony held its first concert on May 27, 1958. They played to a Civic Auditorium crowd of 2000, who gave a standing ovation halfway through the program and made cash donations as they left.

During this era, the Symphony membership consisted primarily of county residents, with recent additions of University of California Santa Cruz and Santa Clara County musicians. Local members included Paul Sandas on the violin, Wally Trabing on the tympani and percussion, Symphony founder Matilda Dedrick on the violin, Sister Joan Louise on the contra bass, and William Doyle on the French horn.

In 1965, the Santa Cruz County Youth Symphony was organized as a separate non-profit organization with cooperation from the County Office of Education. The Youth Symphony began in February 1966 with the first annual Youth Soloists Contest held in March. By January 1968 the Youth Music Program in all its aspects was articulated. The Youth Symphony continues to serve as a training ground for young local musicians, many of whom have gone on to have careers as touring professionals.

Encouraged by Maestro Norman Masonson, Marian Mee organized the Symphony Guild in 1966. As its first chairman, Mee initiated symphony concert previews by the conductor and social functions for the symphony's benefit.

In 1968, the Watsonville Symphony Guild was organized by Geraldine Haden and Marilyn Liddicoat. It coordinated the south county work of the symphony through social functions and concert previews. Its goal was to raise money to support the orchestra,

In 1971, George Barati was appointed conductor. It was he who first attracted professional musicians who were paid for their services. “Barati worked with Bartok, and he led the Honolulu Symphony and Opera for 18 years, so leading a community orchestra was a step down,” said Michael Stamp, former executive director of the Symphony. “But having George Barati here helped us to attract seven strong candidates for his replacement once he left. It was a sign that we were gaining credibility.”

As its popularity grew, the Symphony began appearing at other venues in the county. Said Nancy Meyberg, a former publicity director. “We played at Holy Cross Church, Mission San Juan Batista, Henry Cowell Park, Cabrillo College, the Cocoanut Grove, First Congregational Church, Twin Lakes Church, the Fox Theater in Watsonville, and even Croscetti Hall at the fairgrounds. Sometimes the critics showed up at the wrong venues. The acoustics weren’t always great, but people came because they loved the orchestra.” The symphony also performed at Kennedy Memorial Center, First Christian Church and the Veterans Memorial Hall in Watsonville, E.A. Hall School, Santa Cruz High School Auditorium, Aptos High School and the UCSC College Five Dining Hall. The annual Pops for Pops Concert was held every Father's Day at Henry Cowell Park.

More change was in store

After settling in at the Cabrillo College Theater, it seemed as if the Symphony had a sort-of permanent home. However, the college had priority on calendar dates, which put the orchestra at a disadvantage. In addition, seating was limited to about 500. It became painfully apparent that Santa Cruz County had no performing arts facility that combined a proper sound system, reasonable acoustics, concert hall seating arrangements, and sufficient capacity. After the earthquake in 1989 closed several venues, the Symphony had little choice but to move back to the Civic Auditorium, with concerts at the new Mello Center in Watsonville serving the South County communities beginning in 1994. In fact, the Symphony was involved in building the Mello, including initial grants from the Packard Foundation to help fund an expansion.

Still, playing at the Civic was no picnic. The site had been created as a multi-use facility, including for basketball games, and its acoustic tile ceilings and hardwood floors did nothing to enhance the instruments’ sound quality. But Rick Larsen, facilities manager for the Civic, was determined to make it work. In three phases, he and his crew, with the advice of acoustician Red Wetherill, installed an acoustic wall behind the orchestra, acoustic panels for the back wall (which came from the old Fox Theater), and acoustic “clouds” that came from Davies Hall in San Francisco. All together, the installations greatly improved the musical richness. The gift of a permanent Steinway piano in 2006 took the Symphony performances up another notch.

Challenges were met and overcome

The Symphony's evolution wasn't always smooth. As an arts organization, its funding depends on donor generosity, which often depends on the overall economy. Sometimes financial management has been a learning experience, as well. Jan Derecho, former executive director of the Symphony and a member of the Cabrillo Chorus, recalled some particular challenges.

“We were in financial crisis not long ago, and our then conductor, Larry Granger, believed that increasing the quality of our orchestra would be a key part of attracting grants and other funding,” she said. “After a lot of hard work, he submitted tapes to the California Arts Council and achieved a ‘4-rating’ for us, which is the highest ever given to any orchestra of our budget size. The community also came together to help us cure our deficit in a time when orchestras in major cities were closing down. It was a wonderful day when we had a party to celebrate burning the debt.”

After Detlev Anders, music directors included Norman Masonson, George Barati, Kenneth Klein and Mitch Klein, along with Joann Falletta and Ed Houghton, who were interim music directors. They Symphony’s next director, John Larry Granger, impressed the selection committee right from the start. During his interviews, he showed a passion for quality, great musical knowledge, high standards for himself and his musicians, and a disarming wit and charm. It was a great benefit to attract him from Orange County’s South Coast Symphony in 1990.

Maestro Granger immediately challenged the musicians to stretch their talents. For his opening concert, Larry brought in the brilliant pianist Leonard Pennario, who so impressed the audience that they howled and stomped, demanding two encores. It only got better from there. Over the years, Larry has leveraged his contacts to attract many other notables such as Jon Nakamatsu, Stephen Prutsman, Norman Krieger, Awadagin Pratt, Anton Nel, Sheryl Staples, Jennifer Frautschi, Lazlo Vargas, David Shifrin, William Bennett and John DeLancie.

“Larry has been an incredible leader for the Symphony,” said Linda Burroughs, former board president. “It has evolved into such an outstanding asset for Santa Cruz, and I speak for the entire board when I say that it’s a labor of love for everyone who is involved. We are privileged to support an outstanding organization while enjoying live performances of some of the world’s best music.” But classics aren't classics by themselves. The Symphony has brilliantly partnered with groups such as the Cabrillo Symphonic Chorus, Santa Cruz Youth Symphony, Kuumbwa Jazz Honor Band, Santa Cruz Ballet Theatre, Watsonville Taiko, the Klein International String Competition, the Watsonville Community Band, ZunZun, KUSP radio, and many others. For several years, The White Album Ensemble with members of the Symphony presented a wildly popular program of Beatles’ music in a cabaret setting.

“The fact is, we are not a roses-and-violins kind of orchestra,” said Nancy. “This is Santa Cruz. We’re young, athletic, and dynamic. We appreciate innovation, and we don’t like the same old stuff. That’s why our posters and program books —and even the musical pieces themselves—have blended a classical approach with a modern twist. We are very accessible to young people and families, and we’re very big on the educational aspect so people understand what they’re hearing. We’re very proud of who we are and how we got here.”

Rowland “Reb” Rebele, longtime Symphony sponsor and former board president, said, “The biggest blessing in my life is seeing the orchestra develop so well over the years, despite the typical financial and organizational challenges. But so many people cared about the Symphony, and they stepped up to help us through to the next level. Santa Cruz is a very small community to have an orchestra of this quality, and for that, we are extremely fortunate.”

A new chapter

In 2012, Maestro Granger announced that he was retiring. During the 2012–2013 concert season, five conductor finalists were invited to perform with the Symphony. Using feedback from the Board, musicians and audience, the search committee selected the Santa Cruz County Symphony's newest conductor, Daniel Patrick Stewart, who also holds the position of assistant to James Levine, conductor of the New York Metropolitan Opera. Maestro Stewart has already brought in such excellent soloists as pianists Yuja Wang, Jon Nakamatsu, Nicolas Hodges and Jeffrey Kahane. Because of his involvement with the Met's Young Artist Lindemann Program, Stewart has also attracted a number of Met soloists, including Yunpeng Wang, Ying Fang, Nadine Sierra, Anthony Roth Constanzo, John Moore, Ginger Costa-Jackson, Ryan Speedo Green, Victor Ryan Robertson, Steven Condy, Michelle Bradley, Hadleigh Adams, Stuart Neill, Peixin Chen, and Jennifer Johnson Cano. Stewart is also a fan of contemporary music and has had the Symphony perform such pieces as Thomas Ades' "In Seven Days", HK Gruber's "Frankenstein!!" with Gruber performing as chansonnier, and Stewart's own Sinfonia (2011) among others.

Under Maestro Stewart's leadership, the Symphony has continued to improve to rave reviews. In fact, after the third concert, reviewer Joe Sekon stated, "Arguably, the Santa Cruz County Symphony Orchestra under Daniel Stewart has now developed into the finest musical ensemble South of San Francisco and North of Los Angeles. The boundary line that separates these fine world class orchestras is on the verge of shifting from microscopic to invisible. Michael Tilson Thomas and Gustavo Dudamel be forewarned!" 

In November 2016, Maestro brought together an incredible ensemble to perform The Barber of Seville in concert. This was followed by one of the most anticipated and highest-profile concerts in the Symphony's history – pianist Yuja Wang performing Prokofiev Piano Concerto No. 5 for the first time and Brahms Piano Concerto No. 2. Of this performance, San Francisco Classical Voice said, " The orchestra under Stewart’s baton was crisp, energetic, and tightly wound. Yuja matched this quality with ease. The result was an enjoyable performance of a spiky concerto." Her collaboration with Daniel Stewart was obviously successful, as shortly thereafter she announced that she would return to Santa Cruz County only four months later to again perform two piano concerti – in this case her first performance of Beethoven Piano Concerto No. 1 and Brahms Piano Concerto No. 1.

Youth and music education

After years of holding a single concert annually at the Civic for 2000 4th, 5th and 6th grades, an entirely new concept was devised with the arrival of Maestro Kenneth Klein in 1981. His deep interest in providing musicians and audiences for the future was met with enthusiasm by the Program Committee chaired by Mildred Buhler. Under her supervision, a docent program was created whereby teams were trained and set to all the participating schools – both public and private – to prepare the children for the ensuing concerts. These concerts were held in three different areas of the county for approximately 6000 children. School concerts performed by chamber groups of symphony musicians started as early as 1970.

Using a different theme each year the docents, with both audio and visual aids, introduced the children to the four families of instruments; to the lives of the composers and the “story” or meaning of their compositions; and to the important role of the conductor.

Kenneth Klein conducted the concerts in 1982 and 1983. A family emergency after the first of the 1984 concerts necessitated his replacement by Mitchell Sardou Klein (no relation). Mitchell Klein again replaced Kenneth Klein in 1985 and conducted the 1986 concerts as well.

In 1984–85, eleven docent teams visited 51 schools in the four-week period preceding the concert. The Santa Cruz Youth Ballet and Studio Ballet Theatre presented a very beautiful ballet choreographed by Jen Dumphy and Marcia Quigly to the music of Tchaikovsky's “Waltz of the Flowers.” Barbara Lingafelter served as narrator in 1982 and 1985.

Starting in 1981, the Symphony performed six free Youth concerts over three days for 600 4th, 5th and 6th graders – 2 at the Crosetti Hall (Santa Cruz County Fairgrounds) in Watsonville, 2 at the Santa Cruz Civic Auditorium and 2 in either San Lorenzo Valley or Scotts Valley. In 1989 after the earthquake, the Watsonville concerts moved to the Fox Theater for one year, then to the Twin Lakes Baptist Church for 1990–92. In 1993, the number of concerts was reduced to four, all performed at the Santa Cruz Civic Auditorium. In 1994, the Symphony moved its South County performances to the new Henry J. Mello Center for the Performing Arts at the Watsonville High School with two at the Santa Cruz Civic Auditorium. These have continued annually to the present day, except for 2002 when the Youth Concerts were cancelled due to financial concerns. Fortunately, the Board recognized the importance of these concerts and reinstated them the following year.

In 1995/96, the Board voted to perform the Youth Concert with reduced-price admission for families, launching the Family Concert. It has continued every year since at the Santa Cruz Civic Auditorium. For a few years, the Family Concert was also performed at the Mello Center, but the attendance was so low that it was not financially feasible. Following the Family Concert is what has been called "Meet the Instruments" and the "Orchestra Petting Zoo" – a chance for children of all ages to meet musicians and actually try out the different instruments.

The Symphony's Youth and Family Concert program has been an important asset to local educators. Symphony musicians annually visit elementary schools county-wide, giving live demonstrations and providing the children with a rare opportunity to ask questions of symphony players. The students are then treated to a free concert at the Santa Cruz Civic or Mello Center in Watsonville, featuring guests of varied arts disciplines and musical styles. Members of the Santa Cruz County Youth Symphony join Symphony musicians onstage. Other recent collaborations have been with Santa Cruz Ballet Theatre, Kuumbwa Jazz Honor Band, Santa Cruz Shakespeare and Cabrillo Youth Chorus.

For 2018, the Santa Cruz Symphony will incorporate Carnegie Hall's LinkUp program for the first time into their Youth Concerts. This program provides music and teaching materials for free to any schools in the county to teach students various pieces on recorders. The students then come to the Youth Concerts with their recorders and play with the Symphony. In order to increase the attendance to 5000 students, the Symphony will be performing the Youth Concerts at the Kaiser Permanente Arena in Santa Cruz for the first time.

In 2012, the Symphony embraced another music education program – the Brummit-Taylor in-class classical music listening program. Geared toward elementary schools, this program enables teachers to introduce classical music to their students on a daily basis. The program targets second through fifth graders and was piloted in 2012 with 10 teachers in four schools. The Santa Cruz County Office of Education has been actively working with the Symphony to maximize the number of Classical Music Classrooms throughout the county. Currently, over 1500 students experience classical music daily in 17 of the County's 31 elementary schools. The goal is to reach every elementary school student in the county, at both public and private schools.

In November 2016, the Arts Council of Santa Cruz County released its Arts Education Data Mapping Pilot Project and reported that over 50% of arts education programs in the schools in Santa Cruz County are music programs. In recognition of the work the Symphony has done with its music education programs, the Santa Cruz Symphony was named one of the top three providers of arts education in Santa Cruz County schools, after the schools themselves and the Arts Council.

History factoids

When the Symphony was first organized, musicians paid for the chance to play! Their membership dues were $1 each, plus a 25-cent contribution at each rehearsal.

The symphony was called the Santa Cruz Symphony Orchestra at its founding in 1958. In 1967 the Symphony Association Board changed the name to the Santa Cruz County Symphony Association "in keeping with the all-county scope of its work." In 2013, the Symphony Association Board changed the name to Santa Cruz Symphony.

Lou Harrison composed a piece for the Santa Cruz Symphony in 1961 titled Suite from The Marriage at the Eiffel Tower.

During the first several years of its existence, no admission was charged for the orchestra's performances, Funds came from audience donations, fund drives and other contributions.

In 1969, the Watsonville and Santa Cruz Symphony Guilds merged to become the Santa Cruz County Symphony Guild.

The first Pops for Pops held in Henry Cowell Redwood on Father's Day was in 1984.

Music directors

Board presidents

References

External links
 official website
 George Barati: A Life in Music

Musical groups established in 1958
Orchestras based in California
Watsonville, California
1958 establishments in California